{{DISPLAYTITLE:Indium (111In) capromab pendetide}}

Indium (111In) capromab pendetide (trade name Prostascint) is used to image the extent of prostate cancer. Capromab is a mouse monoclonal antibody which recognizes a protein found on both prostate cancer cells and normal prostate tissue. It is linked to pendetide, a derivative of DTPA. Pendetide acts as a chelating agent for the radionuclide indium-111. Following an intravenous injection of Prostascint, imaging is performed using single-photon emission computed tomography (SPECT).

Early trials with yttrium (90Y) capromab pendetide were also conducted.

References 

Radiopharmaceuticals
Antibody-drug conjugates
Indium compounds